Susan Elizabeth Gibson  (née Thomas, 11 March 1960) is a British research chemist, Professor and Chair in Chemistry and Director of the Graduate School at Imperial College London. Gibson is an expert in chemical synthesis and catalysis.

Education 
Gibson was educated at Darwen Vale High School and the University of Cambridge as an undergraduate student of Sidney Sussex College, Cambridge, where she studied the Natural Sciences Tripos. She completed postgraduate study at the University of Oxford as a student of New College, Oxford where she obtained a Doctor of Philosophy degree in Chemistry in 1984 for research supervised by Stephen G. Davies.

Career and research
After her PhD, Gibson spent a year at the ETH Zürich as a post-doctoral researcher. Her early research focused on using transition metal chemistry and its applications in organic synthesis.

The Gibson Group's work contributed to areas such as, carbonylation, enzymatic resolution, ligand design, amino acid and peptide synthesis, medicinal chemistry, macrocycle synthesis, asymmetric induction, dendrimer construction, linker technology and multi-component catalysis.

She began her research career at the University of Warwick in 1985 and moved to Imperial College London in 1990. Between 1998 and 2003 she held the Daniell Chair of Chemistry at King's College London, before returning to Imperial College London where she has been the Chair in Chemistry and Director of the Graduate School since November 2013. She was President of the Organic Division of the Royal Society of Chemistry between 2007 and 2010 and chaired the organisation's awards committee from 2011 to 2014.

Publications
Sue is the main author on over 140 publications, including a text book that has been translated into French and German.

 Synthesis of (+)- and (-)-Gossonorol and Cyclisation to Boivinianin B
 Synthesis of enantioenriched secondary and tertiary alcohols via tricarbonylchromium(0) complexes of benzyl allyl ethers
 Cyclisation of bisphosphonate substituted enynes
 Substitution of a benzylic hydrogen by nucleophiles on a chromium tricarbonyl complex of a benzyl ether

Honours and awards
 1990, Meldola Medal awarded from the Royal Society of Chemistry (RSC)
 1993, Zeneca Award for Organic Chemistry from AstraZeneca
 1997, Hickinbottom Fellowship from the Royal Society of Chemistry
 1999, Novartis Chemistry Lectureship
 2003, Inaugural winner of the Rosalind Franklin Award. She used the award to fund a series of UK lectureships for internationally renowned female chemists.
 2013, Gibson was appointed an Officer of the Most Excellent Order of the British Empire (OBE) for services to Chemistry and Science Education in the 2013 New Year Honours

References 

1960 births
Living people
Alumni of Sidney Sussex College, Cambridge
Alumni of New College, Oxford
Academics of King's College London
English chemists
Fellows of the Royal Society of Chemistry